Asiaephorus extremus is a moth of the family Pterophoridae. It is known from Mindanao in the Philippines.

The wingspan is about 16 mm. Adults are on wing in August.

Etymology
The name expresses the very long cucullar process in the male genitalia.

References

Platyptiliini
Moths described in 2003